The 2019 Swedish Women's Curling Championship was held in Jönköping from 2 to 6 January 2019.

Both 2019 Swedish Men's Curling Championship and 2019 Swedish Wheelchair Curling Championship were held simultaneously with this championship at the same arena.

Teams

Round Robin

Playoffs

Semifinal. 6 January, 9:00 am

Final. 6 January, 2:00 pm

Final standings

References

See also
2019 Swedish Men's Curling Championship
2019 Swedish Mixed Curling Championship
2019 Swedish Mixed Doubles Curling Championship
2019 Swedish Junior Curling Championships
2019 Swedish Wheelchair Curling Championship

2019
Swedish Women's Curling Championship
Swedish Women's Curling Championship
Curling Women's Championship
Swedish Women's Curling Championship
Sports competitions in Jönköping
2019 in Swedish women's sport